Fox's may refer to:

 Fox's Biscuits, a bakery company in the United Kingdom
 Fox's Confectionery, a confectioner in the United Kingdom
Fox's Glacier Mints
 Fox's Pizza Den, a pizza restaurant chain

See also